The American musical group Pink Martini, based in Portland, Oregon, has recorded songs for six studio albums, one compilation album, and one video album featuring live concert footage. Formed by Thomas Lauderdale in 1994, the group that has been described as a "mini-orchestra" performs songs of many music genres in multiple languages by lead vocalist China Forbes. Their debut album Sympathique was released through the group's own independent record label, Heinz Records, in 1997 – subsequent recordings were also released through Heinz. The album includes three original tracks, "Sympathique", "La Soledad", and "Lullaby"; cover versions include Ernesto Lecuona's "Amado Mio", Maurice Ravel's "Boléro", "Brazil" (Ary Barroso), "Never on Sunday" (Manos Hatzidakis), and "Que Sera Sera" by Jay Livingston and Ray Evans.

Hang On Little Tomato, released in 2004, features more original songs; covers include "Anna (El Negro Zumbón)" by Francesco Giordano and Roman Vatro, "Kikuchiyo to Mohshimasu" (Yoichi Suzuki, Michio Yamagami), and Heitor Villa-Lobos "Song of the Black Swan (O canto do cysne negro)". In 2007, the group released Hey Eugene! Songs include the title track, written by Forbes, and covers in several languages: "Bukra Wba'do" (Mounir Mourad, Fatehi Qorah) in Arabic, the French chanson "Ojalá", "Tempo Perdido" (Ataulfo Alves) in Portuguese, and "Taya Tan" (Taku Izumi, Michio Yamagami) in Japanese, among others. The album also features guest vocals by Little Jimmy Scott on "Tea for Two", originally written by Irving Caesar and Vincent Youmans.

Pink Martini's fourth studio album, Splendor in the Grass, was released in 2009. Forbes performs songs in five languages (English, French, Italian, Neapolitan, and Spanish). Guest vocalists include Ari Shapiro on "But Now I'm Back", Chavela Vargas on "Piensa en mí", and Emilio Delgado on "Sing". The group also released the video album Discover the World: Live in Concert in 2009, which features live concert footage and includes the original song "The Flying Squirrel" and a cover of Ernesto Lecuona's "Malagueña". In 2010, Pink Martini released its fifth studio album, the holiday-themed Joy to the World. Christmas music includes "Do You Hear What I Hear?", "Little Drummer Boy", "Santa Baby", "Silent Night" performed in Arabic, English and German, "We Three Kings", and "White Christmas". Hanukkah music includes Danny Maseng's "Elohai, N'Tzor" and "Ocho Kandelikas" (Flory Jagoda), performed in Ladino. The album also commemorates New Year's Day with "Auld Lang Syne" and Chinese New Year with "Congratulations".

The group released two albums in 2011: 1969 with Saori Yuki and A Retrospective, a compilation album with tracks from previous studio albums plus unreleased material. 1969 includes covers of "Is That All There Is?", "Mas que Nada", and "Puff, the Magic Dragon". A Retrospective contains collaborations with Michael Feinstein ("How Long Will It Last?"), Georges Moustaki ("Ma Solitude"), and film director Gus Van Sant ("Moon River"), along with remixes by Johnny Dynell ("Una Notte a Napoli") and Hiroshi Wada ("Kikuchiyo to Mohshimasu").

Songs

References

General
 
 

Specific

Pink Martini